Predrag Đajić (1 May 1922 – 13 May 1979) was a Bosnian Serb and Yugoslav footballer.

Club career
He had started his playing career before World War II, and had played in Slavija Sarajevo in the 1930s before coming to SK Jugoslavija in 1940.

After the war, he was one of the founders of Red Star Belgrade in 1945, and played for the club until his retirement in 1955. He played 439 games (143 in the Yugoslav First League) and scored 59 goals for the club. He was state champion with Red Star in 1951 and 1953 and he won the national cup in 1948, 1949 and 1950.

International career
He made his debut in the Yugoslavia national team in October 1949 against France and was a member of the squad until 1953. He played three games on the World Cup 1950. He has earned a total of 17 caps, scoring no goals. His final international was a January 1953 friendly match against Egypt.

Personal life
Parallel to his football career Đajić earned an economics diploma and later worked in foreign trade. He was stationed in Warsaw when he suffered a heart attack in May 1979 at the age of 57.

References

External links

  Predrag Đajić profile at Serbian national football team website

1922 births
1979 deaths
Footballers from Sarajevo
Serbs of Bosnia and Herzegovina
Association football midfielders
Yugoslav footballers
Yugoslavia international footballers
1950 FIFA World Cup players
FK Slavija Sarajevo players
SK Jugoslavija players
Red Star Belgrade footballers
Yugoslav First League players